Seynod is a former commune in the Haute-Savoie department in the Auvergne-Rhône-Alpes region in south-eastern France. On 1 January 2017, it was merged into the commune Annecy.

The inhabitants of Seynod are called Seynodiens.

Administration
The town of Seynod is the seat of a canton which includes twelve communes. It is part of the Communauté d'agglomération du Grand Annecy.

Geography
To the south-southeast of the commune is the massif of Semnoz.

Landmarks
 Châteauvieux
 Château de Périaz
 Église Saint-Maurice du XVIe siècle, remaniée XVIIe et XIXe.

Sports
The town is equipped with an auditorium and a summer/winter water sports complex. There is also a skate-park.

Twin towns
The town of Seynod was formally twinned with the town of Ineu in Romania September 26, 1999. A sponsorship has existed since 1989.

In 2002, the municipality proposed to be twinned with the town of Malgrat de Mar in Catalonia.

Festivals
Every first Sunday of September, the association Les Amis du Vieux Seynod organise the fête du Vieux Seynod, the goal of which is to recall the rural traditions and craftsmanship of the inhabitants.

See also
Communes of the Haute-Savoie department

References

External links

 Town council website

Former communes of Haute-Savoie
Populated places disestablished in 2017